Daylon Mack (born February 23, 1997) is an American football nose tackle for the Memphis Showboats of the United States Football League (USFL). He played college football at Texas A&M.

Professional career

Baltimore Ravens
Mack was drafted by the Baltimore Ravens in the fifth round, 160th overall, of the 2019 NFL Draft. On November 12, 2019, Mack was placed on injured reserve with a leg injury.

On August 1, 2020, Mack was waived to get below the required 80-man roster limit for training camp under the revised COVID-19 rules.

Detroit Lions
Mack was claimed off of waivers by the Detroit Lions on August 2, 2020, but was waived five days later with a failed physical designation.

New York Giants
Mack was signed by the New York Giants on August 17, 2020. He was waived on September 5, 2020.

Green Bay Packers
On September 10, Mack was signed to the Green Bay Packers practice squad. He was released on September 16.

Arizona Cardinals
On November 24, 2020, Mack was signed to the Arizona Cardinals' practice squad. Mack was released on December 21, 2020.

Tennessee Titans
On January 14, 2021, Mack signed a reserve/future contract with the Tennessee Titans. He was waived on June 3, 2021.

Tampa Bay Bandits
Mack was drafted by the Tampa Bay Bandits of the United States Football League in the 24th round of the 2022 USFL Draft. He was transferred to the team's inactive roster on April 22, 2022, due to a thigh injury. He was transferred to the active roster on April 30.

Memphis Showboats
Mack and all other Tampa Bay Bandits players were all transferred to the Memphis Showboats after it was announced that the Bandits were taking a hiatus and that the Showboats were joining the league.

References

External links
Texas A&M bio

1997 births
Living people
American football defensive tackles
Arizona Cardinals players
Baltimore Ravens players
Detroit Lions players
Green Bay Packers players
New York Giants players
People from Gladewater, Texas
Players of American football from Texas
Tennessee Titans players
Texas A&M Aggies football players
Tampa Bay Bandits (2022) players